Carolina County Ball is the second studio album by the rock band Elf, released as an LP in 1974 on the MGM label.  It was released in the United States and Japan as L.A.59. The album is the first to feature Craig Gruber on bass.

Track listing 
On some of the European releases of "Carolina County Ball", the first song is listed as "Carolina Country Ball" making this album somewhat of a collector's item.

Personnel

Elf 
 Ronnie James Dio - lead vocals
 Steve Edwards - lead guitar
 Micky Lee Soule - keyboards, rhythm guitar
 Craig Gruber - bass
 Gary Driscoll - drums

Additional musicians 
 Helen Chappell, Liza Strike, & Barry St. John - backing vocals
 The Manor Chorus - vocals on "Blanche"
 Roger Glover - string arrangements, production
 Mountain Fjord, M.D., & Martyn Ford - strings
 Ray Swinfield - clarinet
 Chris Pyne - trombone
 Henry Lowther - trumpet

Production staff 
 Lou (Conway) Austin, Simon Heyworth - recording engineers
 Colin Hart, Raymond Da'Rio - equipment
 Mixed at Kingsway Recorders
 Fin Costello - photography

References

External links
'Carolina County Ball' tour dates

Elf (band) albums
1974 albums
MGM Records albums